The nearly thirty Palaungic or Palaung–Wa languages form a branch of the Austroasiatic languages.

Phonological developments
Most of the Palaungic languages lost the contrastive voicing of the ancestral Austroasiatic consonants, with the distinction often shifting to the following vowel. In the Wa branch, this is generally realized as breathy voice vowel phonation; in Palaung–Riang, as a two-way register tone system. The Angkuic languages have contour tone — the U language, for example, has four tones, high, low, rising, falling, — but these developed from vowel length and the nature of final consonants, not from the voicing of initial consonants.

Homeland
Paul Sidwell (2015) suggests that the Palaungic Urheimat (homeland) was in what is now the border region of Laos and Sipsongpanna in Yunnan, China. The Khmuic homeland was adjacent to the Palaungic homeland, resulting in many lexical borrowings among the two branches due to intense contact. Sidwell (2014) suggests that the word for 'water' (Proto-Palaungic *ʔoːm), which Gérard Diffloth had used as one of the defining lexical innovations for his Northern Mon-Khmer branch, was likely borrowed from Palaungic into Khmuic.

Classification

Diffloth & Zide (1992)
The Palaungic family includes at least three branches, with the position of some languages as yet unclear. Lamet, for example, is sometimes classified as a separate branch. The following classification follows that of Diffloth & Zide (1992), as quoted in Sidwell (2009:131).

Western Palaungic (Palaung–Riang)
Palaung
Shwe (Gold Palaung, De'ang)
De'ang
Pale (Silver Palaung, Ruching)
Rumai
Riang
Riang proper, Yinchia
? Danau (perhaps in Palaung–Riang)
Eastern Palaungic
Angkuic
Angku
Hu
Kiorr
Kon Keu
Man Met
Mok
Samtao (Samtau)
Tai Loi
U (Pouma)
Lametic
Lamet (Xmet)
Con
Waic
Blang 
Lawa
La
Lawa
Wa
Paraok (Standard Wa)
Khalo
Awa

Some researchers include the Mangic languages as well, instead of grouping them with the Pakanic languages.

Sidwell (2010)
The following classification follows the branching given by Sidwell (2010, ms).

Danau (Khano)
Palaungic proper
Western (Riang–Palaung)
Palaung (De'ang: Shwe / Gold Palaung, Pale / Ruching / Silver Palaung, Rumai)
Riang (Riang, Yinchia)
Angkuic
Hu
U (P'uman)
Kiorr (Kha Kior, Con)
Kon Keu (Angku)
Mok (Man Met)
Mong Lue (Tai Loi)
Muak Sa-aak
Lamet (Xmet)
Waic
Blang (Samtao)
Lawa
Umpai Lawa
Bo Luang Lawa
Wa
Paraok (Standard Wa)
Khalo
Awa
Meung Yum
Savaiq

Sidwell (2014) proposes an additional branch, consisting of:
Bit–Khang
Bit
Kháng
Bumang
Quang Lam

Sidwell (2015)
Sidwell (2015:12) provides a revised classification of Palaungic. Bit–Khang is clearly Palaungic, but contains many Khmuic loanwords. Sidwell (2015:12) believes it likely groups within East Palaungic. On the other hand, Sidwell (2015) considers Danaw to be the most divergent Palaungic language.
Danaw
West Palaungic
Palaung (Dara’ang, Da’ang, Palay, etc.)
Rumai
Riang (Riang-Lang, Riang-Sak, etc.)
East Palaungic
Waic
Wa (Praok, Awa, Vo, etc.)
Lawa (Lawa Bo Luang, Lavua/Luwa, etc.)
Bulang  (Bulang, Plang/Samtao, Kawa, Kontoi, etc.)
Angkuic: U, Hu, Man Met/Kemie, Muak/Mok, Tai Loi, etc.
Lameet: Lameet, Con, Lua/Khamet
? Bit–Khang: (Kha)bit, Buxing, Quang Lam, Khang/Khao, Bumang

Lexical innovations
Diagnostic Palaungic lexical innovations as identified by Paul Sidwell (2021) are:

Reconstruction

References

Further reading

External links 
 RWAAI (Repository and Workspace for Austroasiatic Intangible Heritage)
 Palaungic languages in RWAAI Digital Archive